Earl C. Banks (June 11, 1924 – October 27, 1993) was an American football player, coach, and college athletics administrator. He served as the head coach at Morgan State College—now known as Morgan State University—from 1960 to 1973, compiling a record of 96–31–2, and as the athletic director at the school from 1970 to 1983. Banks was inducted into the College Football Hall of Fame as a coach in 1992. He died on October 27, 1993 as a result of a car crash in Baltimore.

Head coaching record

Football

References

External links
 Morgan State Hall of Fame profile
 

1924 births
1993 deaths
American football guards
Iowa Hawkeyes football players
Maryland Eastern Shore Hawks baseball coaches
Maryland Eastern Shore Hawks football coaches
Morgan State Bears athletic directors
Morgan State Bears football coaches
College Football Hall of Fame inductees
Players of American football from Philadelphia
African-American coaches of American football
African-American players of American football
20th-century African-American sportspeople
Road incident deaths in Maryland